Samuel Miller Breckinridge Long (May 16, 1881 – September 26, 1958) was an American diplomat and politician.  He served in the administrations of Woodrow Wilson and Franklin Delano Roosevelt.  He is infamous among Holocaust historians for making it difficult for European Jews to enter the United States in the 1930s and '40s.

Early life
Breckinridge Long was born on May 16, 1881, to Margaret Miller Breckinridge and William Strudwick Long in St. Louis, Missouri. Long was a member of the Breckinridge family, which has been described as "practically Confederate aristocracy". Long was a distant cousin of Henry Skillman Breckinridge (1886–1960), who was the United States Assistant Secretary of War from 1913-1916 under Wilson, and whose daughter married John Stephens Graham, the Assistant Secretary of the Treasury, and commissioners for the Internal Revenue Service and Atomic Energy Commission.

Long graduated from Princeton University in 1904, studied at Washington University School of Law from 1905 to 1906, and received his M.A. from Princeton University in 1909.

Career
In 1906, he was admitted to the bar in Missouri and opened an office in St. Louis in 1907.  Long continued to practice law independently until 1917. From 1914 to 1915, he was a member of the Missouri Code Commission on Revision of Judicial Procedure. Long then worked to establish the League of Nations and supported Wilsonian Democracy. He was credited with drafting Woodrow Wilson's "He kept us out of war" slogan, which helped secure Wilson's reelection as President in 1916.

He joined the State Department shortly after the election. In 1917, Long was appointed Third Assistant Secretary of State and remained at the post until he resigned in 1920 to pursue election to the U.S. Senate from Missouri.  While in the Department of State, he held responsibility for overseeing Asian affairs. During this time he also directed attention to the improvement of U.S. foreign communications policy, and coordinated the first interdepartmental review of U.S. international communications.

In 1920, Long was the Democratic nominee for the U.S. Senate seat in Missouri held by Selden P. Spencer, but was defeated, garnering 44.5% of the vote to Spencer's 53.7%.  He lost a second bid for the Senate in 1922.

FDR administration, World War II, and Antisemitism
Long was a personal friend of future President Franklin Delano Roosevelt, whom he had known as Assistant Secretary of the Navy during the Wilson Administration, and generously contributed to his 1932 Presidential campaign.  Roosevelt rewarded him with the position of U.S. Ambassador to Italy, which he held from 1933 to 1936. During his ambassadorship, he was criticized for advising the president against imposing an embargo on oil shipments to Italy in retaliation for Mussolini's invasion of Ethiopia.  He "somewhat admired European fascism", according to diplomat and historian David McKean.  

Long was a member of a special mission to Brazil, Argentina, and Uruguay in 1938.  Upon the outbreak of war in September 1939, he accepted appointment as a Special Assistant Secretary of State in charge of problems arising from the war, a position he held until January 1940, when he was appointed Assistant Secretary of State. Until February 1941, he was responsible for overseeing twenty-three of the forty-two divisions in the department, before a revision of the workload among the other assistant secretaries.

Long came to believe that he was under constant attack from what he termed radicals and the Jewish press for his stance on strict immigration controls mandated by the immigration laws in force at the time.  In an intra-department memo he circulated in June 1940, Long wrote: "We can delay and effectively stop for a temporary period of indefinite length the number of immigrants into the United States. We could do this by simply advising our consuls to put every obstacle in the way and to require additional evidence and to resort to various administrative devices which would postpone and postpone and postpone the granting of the visas." One of his most powerful tools to keep out potential refugees and immigrants was the public charge rule, which barred the admission of persons deemed likely to become a burden on the state. The standards of proof of not being a public charge were constantly shifting, and that was used to intentionally prevent refugees and immigrants from gaining admission.

Ultimately, the effect of the immigration policies set by Long's department was that, during American involvement in the war, ninety percent of the quota places available to immigrants from countries under German and Italian control were never filled. If they had been, an additional 190,000 people could have escaped the atrocities being committed by the Nazis. Along with Isaiah Bowman, Long has been called a modern day Haman for his use of political position to cause harm to the Jewish People.

In November 1943, when the House was considering two bills that would have established a separate government agency charged with assisting the rescue of Jewish refugees, Long gave secret testimony to the House Foreign Affairs Committee that the majority of 580,000 refugees admitted from Europe were Jewish, and that such legislation would be a rebuke of the State Department in wartime. Long noted in his diary that day that he erred by speaking without notes (the actual numbers were 568,000 visas authorized and only 545,000 issued), but historians have noted his testimony was misleading because he implied that all of the refugees were Jews.

An extreme nativist, Long is largely remembered for his obstructionist role as the official responsible for granting refugee visas during World War II. He obstructed rescue attempts, drastically restricted immigration, and falsified figures of refugees admitted. The exposure of his misdeeds led to his demotion, in 1944. He has become the major target of criticism of America's refugee and rescue policy. He justified that in his diary by referring to the laws in the United States imposing strict quotas on the number of immigrants from particular countries, and his great concern about the possibility that Germany and the Soviet Union would infiltrate spies or subversive agents into the United States amidst the large numbers of refugees.

Long resigned from the State Department in November 1944 and went into retirement.

Personal life
He married Christine Alexander Graham,  in 1912.

His special interests included the collection of antiques, paintings and American ship models. He maintained a stable of thoroughbred race horses and was a director of the Laurel Park Racecourse in Laurel, Maryland. He enjoyed fox hunting, fishing, and sailing.

Long died in Laurel, Maryland, on September 26, 1958. His widow died in Palm Beach, Florida, in 1959, aged 71.

Legacy
His personal papers are available for research at the Library of Congress.

In fiction, the character "Breckinridge Long", assistant Secretary of State, appears in Herman Wouk's War and Remembrance and B.A. Shapiro's The Muralist. He was portrayed by Eddie Albert in the 1988 miniseries adaptation of Wouk's novel.

References

Further reading

External links
 

1881 births
1958 deaths
Ambassadors of the United States to Italy
Politicians from St. Louis
Washington University School of Law alumni
Breckinridge family
American racehorse owners and breeders
People from Laurel, Maryland
Princeton University alumni
20th-century American diplomats